The action of 11 September 1779 was a minor naval engagement that took place off Charles Town in the War of the American Independence between the French Navy and the Royal Navy. The battle ended with the capture of the British post ship Ariel  by Amazone.

On 11 September 1779, whilst the Ariel was cruising off Charles Town under Captain Thomas Mackenzie, she sighted a strange sail and approached to investigate, unaware that a French fleet under the Admiral comte d'Estaing had entered the theatre from the West Indies. As Mackenzie got closer he realized that the stranger was actually a frigate, accompanied by two brigs and a schooner, and that she was not responding to his signals, he had to retreat for the Georgia shore. The frigate gradually overhauled Ariel and Mackenzie was forced to stand and fight. The enemy vessel was the 36-gun French Amazone. The crews of these two vessels then went to man a variety of British vessels on the North America Station. The French took the captured ship into service  as Ariel.

Ariel underwent repair and refitting at Lorient between March and October 1780. The French lent her to the American Continental Navy in October, where she served briefly as USS Ariel under John Paul Jones.

References

Citations

Bibliography
Demerliac, Alain (1996) La Marine De Louis XVI: Nomenclature Des Navires Français De 1774 À 1792. (Nice: Éditions OMEGA). 

Naval battles of the American Revolutionary War involving France
Naval battles of the American Revolutionary War
Conflicts in 1779
1779 in South Carolina
Battles in the Southern theater of the American Revolutionary War 1775–1779
Battles of the American Revolutionary War in South Carolina